Alberto Tavazzi (1912–2006) was an Italian painter, art director and occasional actor.

From 1939 Tavazzi began working on the design and construction of film sets. He was a friend of the director Roberto Rossellini, who cast him in the title role as a Catholic Priest in his 1943 war film The Man with a Cross. Tavazzi played a priest again in Rossellini's 1945 neorealist drama Rome, Open City.

Selected filmography

Art director 

 Equator (1939)
 Toto and the King of Rome (1951)

Actor 
 The Man with a Cross (1943)
 Rome, Open City (1945)

References

Bibliography 
 Bondanella, Peter. The Films of Roberto Rossellini. Cambridge University Press, 1993.

External links 
 

1912 births
2006 deaths
Italian male film actors
Italian art directors
Male actors from Rome
20th-century Italian male actors